Pyrausta pachyceralis is a moth in the family Crambidae. It was described by George Hampson in 1900. It is found in Armenia and Turkey.

References

Moths described in 1900
pachyceralis
Moths of Europe
Moths of Asia